During the 1992–93 English football season, Oldham Athletic competed in the inaugural season of the FA Premier League, their second season since promotion back to the top flight of English football, and secured a third successive season at this level thanks to a three-match winning run at the end of the season which saved them from relegation on goal difference.

Season summary
Oldham started the season well and stood in midtable after eleven games, but struggled thereafter and were bottom of the Premier League with ten games left to play.  Two successive wins briefly lifted Oldham out of the relegation zone, but failed to win any of their next four matches and looked dead and buried with three games left to play.  For the club to survive relegation, three wins from their final three matches were required, and the Latics had to bank on Crystal Palace gaining no more than one point from their final two matches. Oldham's first game of the final trio was away at second placed Aston Villa, who had to win to have any hope of winning that year's title.  In a battling display, Nick Henry scored the winner midway through the first half, a shock result but one that gave hope to an unlikely escape and clinched the first title for 26 years for Oldham's local rivals Manchester United.  Three days later, Liverpool were beaten 3–2 at Boundary Park, whilst Crystal Palace gained a draw at Manchester City.  For Oldham to survive, they would have to beat fellow strugglers Southampton at home and hope that Crystal Palace were defeated at Arsenal.  Having led 4–1 at one point, Oldham survived a late Southampton comeback to win 4–3.  Palace lost 3–0 at Arsenal, meaning that the Eagles were relegated on goal difference (-13 versus Oldham's -11), though even if Palace lost only 1–0, they still would've been relegated on goals scored (Oldham had 63 goals scored for them whereas Palace had 48 scored for them).

Final league table

Results
Oldham Athletic's score comes first

Legend

FA Premier League

FA Cup

League Cup

Players

First-team squad
Squad at end of season

Left club during season

Notes

References

Oldham Athletic
Oldham Athletic A.F.C. seasons